Membrane progesterone receptor beta (mPRβ), or progestin and adipoQ receptor 8 (PAQR8), is a protein that in humans is encoded by the PAQR8 gene.

See also
 Membrane progesterone receptor
 Progestin and adipoQ receptor

References

Further reading

 
 
 
 
 

7TM receptors